The clean and jerk is a composite of two weightlifting movements, most often performed with a barbell: the clean and the jerk. During the clean, the lifter moves the barbell from the floor to a racked position across the deltoids, without resting fully on the clavicles. During the jerk, the lifter raises the barbell to a stationary position above the head, finishing with straight arms and legs, and the feet in the same plane as the torso and barbell.

Of the several variants of the lift, the most common is the Olympic clean and jerk, which, with the snatch, is included in Olympic weightlifting events.

Clean 

To execute a clean, a lifter grasps the barbell just outside the legs, typically using a hook grip.  Once the barbell is above the knees, the lifter extends explosively (mainly at torso or genitals), raising the bar as high as possible before quickly dropping into a squat and receiving it in a "racked" position in front of the neck and resting on the shoulders.  To complete the clean, the lifter stands, often propelling the bar upward from the shoulders slightly as the erect position is attained and shifting the grip slightly wider and the feet slightly closer together in preparation for the jerk.

Jerk 

The jerk begins from the "front rack" position, which is the finishing position of the clean.  The lifter dips a few inches by bending the knees, keeping the back vertical, and then explosively extends the knees, propelling the barbell upward off the shoulders, and then quickly dropping underneath the bar by pushing upward with the arms and splitting the legs into a lunge position, one forward and one back. The bar is received overhead on straight arms, and, once stable, the lifter recovers from the split position, bringing the feet back into the same plane as the rest of the body.

Variants

Clean 
The power clean, a weight training exercise not used in competition, refers to any variant of the clean in which the lifter does not catch the bar in a full squat position (commonly accepted as thighs parallel to the floor or below).

The hang clean begins with the barbell off the ground, hanging from the arms.  Both power and hang cleans are considered to be ideal for sports conditioning, as they are both total body exercises that have been known to increase neuromuscular co-ordination and core stability.

The continental clean involves lifting the bar from the floor to the final clean position by any method of the lifter's choosing so long as the bar is not upended and does not touch the ground. The bar may be rested on the legs, stomach, or belt. Hands may be removed and replaced. The continental clean plays a special role in strongman training, where the use of an axle bar makes the additional steps of a continental clean necessary.

Jerk 
In the split jerk, the lifter dips down their hips and propels the barbell upward by performing a short jump. The lifter then 'splits' their legs and catches the bar with straight arms above their head.

In the power jerk, the lifter performs the same dip and jump movement, but unlike the split jerk, the lifter catches the barbell in a partial squat position.

The squat jerk is like the power jerk in how the lifter catches the barbell in a squat position, but unlike the power jerk, the lifter catches the barbell in a full squat position with the barbell locked out above their head.

Single arm 
A single arm is used instead of two. The weight lifted is usually a dumbbell or kettlebell. A barbell can also be used. The movement is broadly similar to the two armed clean and jerk, although there are various changes to the range of movement and posture. As a form of unilateral exercise, a single arm clean and jerk can be beneficial for core strength as the lifter has to work to stabilise the off-centred weight. It can also help to reduce an excessive strength imbalance which has developed between the different sides of the body. For example, in a two armed clean and jerk, there may be a muscle imbalance meaning that the right arm is performing an excessively large amount of the work and the left arm an excessively small amount. By using the single arm style and alternating between each arm, it can be ensured that each arm is performing the same amount of work.

World records 
Source:

Men

Women

See also 
 Clean and press
 List of World records in weightlifting

References

External links 

Weightlifting

de:Gewichtheben#Stoßen
fr:Haltérophilie#Épaulé-jeté
pt:Halterofilismo#Arremesso